Bird Studios is a UK production company, founded in 2003, specializing in design, computer animation and visual effects for TV, film and the digital world.

The Managing and Creative Director is a designer/animator, Ian Bird.  Bird Studios specialize in combining photo-realistic 3D Computer animation with live action as well as stand alone CGI animation and the creation of character animation.

History
Bird Studios evolved through a number of companies (Electric Image, Framestore CFC, SOHO 601FX, EYE Animation) under the direction of Ian Bird, producing broadcast title sequences, commercials and music videos.

Projects
Bird studios re-created one of its award-winning music promos, the Pet Shop Boys 'Liberation' from their Very (album) for IMAX as part of its 70 mm stereoscopic 3-D film, 'Cyberworld',

Ian Bird worked with Roger Avary to create the animation and special effects for Sci-Fi TV Film 'Mr. Stitch', starring Rutger Hauer and Wil Wheaton for Rysher Entertainment.

Credits
Commercials: P&GBounty 'Robots', ICRC 'Abuse grows hatred', BBC 'Wimbledon', Nurofen 'For Children', Diet Coke 'sponsoring Will & Grace', Npower (UK) 'New friend', NHS 'Flu-Jab', The Times 'food guide', Save the Children 'Poverty'.
Music Videos: Iron Maiden "Wildest Dreams", "Different World", Robert Post 'Got None', Pet Shop Boys 'Liberation', 'Yesterday, When I was mad', 'Single Bi-lingual',  A-Ha 'Analogue', Soundgarden 'Black Hole Sun', Mike Oldfield 'Let there be light', Meat Loaf "I'd Lie for You (and That's the Truth)".
Title Sequences: Wogan, Des O'Connor Tonight, The Chart Show, Little Napoleons, Capital City, Dennis Potter's Lipstick on Your Collar, Fay Weldon's Loves and Lives of a She Devil and 'The South Bank Show'.

Awards
 Best TV Sport Commercial: Gold Medal winner – BBC WIMBLEDON 'Breaking of champions'.
 New York Festivals 'World Medal': Gold Medal winner – International TV advertising. ‘Save The Children’.
 International Broadcasting Awards: Graphic Artist of the Year – Ian Bird
 Golden Award of Montreaux: Best Animation - Milky Way ‘Magic Stars’
 Golden Award of Montreaux: Best Commercial - Ford Ka ‘Travelogue’
 Imagina: Best Computer Animation - Martell ‘Art of Cognac’
 Leaf: Best Music Promo - Mike Oldfield ‘Let there be light’
 Nicograph Grand Prix: Art Prize winner - Martell (cognac) ‘Art of Cognac’
 Art Directors Club (New York): Gold Award Best Music Video - The Pet Shop Boys ‘Liberation’
 MTV Awards: Best Music Promo - Soundgarden ‘Blackhole Sun’
 Royal Television Society: Gold Team Award - Dennis Potter’s ‘Lipstick On Your Collar’
 Computer Animation Festival: Best Programme Content - Channel Four ‘High-Tech Dreams’
 Parigraph: Winner Advertising Grand Prix  - ‘Dubro Dojke Holland’
 International Monitor Awards: Best titles - BBC Barry Norman's ‘Talking Pictures’

See also
List of animation studios
Maguffin

References

  Iron Maiden article UK FILM AND TELEVISION NEWS
  Maiden News
  MAIDEN FANS
 BBC News
 Promo News
 AWN NEWS
 SOHO lecture
 BLABBERMOUTH news
  British Animation Awards
  IMAX Review
  Variety
  BCDB
  Review
  ANIMAFEST Zagreb
  Roger Avary's 'Mr. Stitch'
  Design Flux
 Hollywood.com
  Digital Arts

External links
Bird Studios website

British animation studios
Entertainment companies established in 2003
2003 establishments in the United Kingdom